Eurovision Young Musicians is a biennial classical music competition for European musicians that are aged between 12 and 21. The contest was created by the European Broadcasting Union (EBU) in 1982. Only members of the EBU may take part in the contest. Six countries took part in the inaugural contest.

Participants
The Eurovision Young Musicians, inspired by the success of the BBC Young Musician of the Year, is a biennial competition organised by the European Broadcasting Union (EBU) for European musicians that are 18 years old or younger. The first edition of the Eurovision Young Musicians took place in Manchester, United Kingdom on 11 May 1982 and 6 countries took part. Germany's Markus Pawlik won the contest, with France and Switzerland placing second and third respectively. The 2020 contest was cancelled, so it will be excluded from the table below.

Listed are all the countries that have ever taken part in the competition, alongside the year in which they made their debut:

Other EBU members
The following list of countries are eligible to participate in Eurovision Young Musicians, but have yet to make their début at the contest.

Participating countries in the decades 
The table lists the participating countries in each decade since the first Eurovision Young Musicians was held in 1982.

1980s

1990s

2000s

2010s

2020s

Broadcast in non-participating countries

List of winners

By contest

By country

The table below shows the top-three placings from each contest, along with the years that a country won the contest.

See also 
 List of countries in Eurovision Choir
 List of countries in the Eurovision Dance Contest
 List of countries in the Eurovision Song Contest
 List of countries in the Eurovision Young Dancers
 List of countries in the Junior Eurovision Song Contest

Notes

References

 
Eurovision Young Musicians